Junshan may refer to:

Junshan District, in Yueyang, Hunan, China
Junshan Island, on Dongting Lake, in Hunan, China
Junshan Yinzhen tea, Yellow tea from Junshan Island
Junshan Township in the Caidian District of Wuhan, Hubei, China